Wrecking Your Neck is a 2-disc live album released by the thrash metal band Overkill in 1995. A March 1995 show, once again in Cleveland, Ohio, was recorded for Overkill's first full-length live album and was released in April 1995; with the first pressing featuring a bonus CD containing the Overkill EP that had been out of print for ten years. A music video for the song "Bastard Nation" was also released. Wrecking Your Neck is also the last Overkill album to feature guitarists Rob Cannavino and Merritt Gant, and their first release on CMC, following the end of their near-decade-long tenure with Atlantic Records.

Track listing

Personnel
 Bobby "Blitz" Ellsworth – lead vocals
 D.D. Verni – bass, backing vocals
 Merritt Gant – guitars, backing vocals
 Rob Cannavino – guitars, backing vocals
 Tim Mallare – drums

References

External links
 Official OVERKILL Site

Overkill (band) albums
1995 live albums
CMC International live albums
Live thrash metal albums